"Sing a Song" is a song recorded by R&B/funk band, Earth, Wind & Fire, which was issued as a single in November 1975 on Columbia Records. The song reached No. 1 on the Billboard Hot Soul Singles chart and No. 5 on the Billboard Hot 100.

Overview
"Sing a Song" spent two weeks atop the Billboard Hot Soul Songs chart. The song was composed by Maurice White with Al McKay and produced by White and Charles Stepney. An instrumental version of Sing a Song was the b-side of the single. Sing a Song also came off the band's 1975 album, Gratitude.

Record World said that "With vocal parlays reminiscent
of early Sly & the Family Stone and a horn section that is as tight as Chicago's, the group should soon be back on top.'"

Samples and covers
"Sing a Song" was covered by the gospel group Point of Grace on their 1996 album, Life Love & Other Mysteries and jazz guitarist Richard Smith on his 2003 album SOuLIDIFIED. Take 6 also covered the song on their 1996 album, Brothers.

"Sing a Song" was sampled by Beyoncé on the track "Hey Goldmember" from the soundtrack to the 2002 feature film Austin Powers in Goldmember.

Appearances in other media
"Sing a Song" appeared on the soundtrack to the 2000 feature film The Color of Friendship. The song was also featured on the soundtrack to the 2003 feature film Something's Gotta Give.

Chart history

Certifications

See also
List of number-one R&B singles of 1976 (U.S.)

References

External links
 

Songs about music
1975 songs
1975 singles
Earth, Wind & Fire songs
Songs written by Maurice White
Songs written by Al McKay
Columbia Records singles